Scarborough Southwest is a federal electoral district in Toronto, Ontario, Canada, that has been represented in the House of Commons of Canada since 1968.

Geography
It covers the southwestern part of the Scarborough part of Toronto.  It stretches from Lake Ontario in the south to Eglinton Avenue in the north.

It consists of the part of the City of Toronto bounded on the west by Victoria Park Avenue, on the south by Lake Ontario, on the north by Eglinton Avenue and on the east by Markham Road.

The riding includes the neighbourhoods of Birch Cliff, Oakridge, Cliffside, Kennedy Park, Clairlea, Cliffcrest and parts of Scarborough Village and the Golden Mile.

History

Scarborough West riding was created in 1966 and from parts of Danforth and York—Scarborough ridings.

It initially consisted of the part of the borough of Scarborough west of a line formed by Midland Avenue the Canadian National Railway line and Brimley Road and south of Eglinton Avenue. It also included the part of the city west of Birchmount Road and south of Lawrence Avenue East.

In 1976, it was redefined to consist of the part of the Borough of Scarborough south Eglinton Avenue East and west of Bellamy Road South, and the part south of Kingston Road and east of Bellamy Ravine Creek.

In 1987, it was redefined to consist of the part of the City of Scarborough south Eglinton Avenue East and west of Markham Road.

The electoral district was abolished in 1996 when it was redistributed when almost all of the riding was transferred to Scarborough Southwest riding.

A new riding named Scarborough Southwest was created out of Scarborough West and a small part of  Scarborough East in 1996. It consisted initially of the part of the City of Scarborough lying south and west of a line drawn from the western city limit east along Eglinton Avenue East, north along Markham Road, east along the Canadian National Railway, southwest along Kingston Road, south along Scarborough Golf Club Road, southwest along Hill Crescent, southeast along Bellamy Ravine Creek.

This riding lost territory to Scarborough Centre and gained territory from Scarborough—Guildwood during the 2012 electoral redistribution.

Demographics 
According to the Canada 2021 Census

Ethnic groups: 37.0% White, 24.8% South Asian, 12.3% Black, 8.6% Filipino, 5.1% Chinese, 1.7% West Asian, 1.6% Indigenous, 1.6% Latin American, 1.0% Arab, 1.0% Southeast Asian

Languages: 54.2% English, 8.0% Bengali, 4.1% Tagalog, 2.4% Tamil, 2.3% Cantonese, 1.9% Urdu, 1.4% Mandarin, 1.3% Spanish, 1.1% Greek, 1.1% Amharic, 1.0% French

Religions: 46.5% Christian (23.0% Catholic, 4.3% Christian Orthodox, 3.0% Anglican, 2.1% United Church, 1.2% Pentecostal, 12.9% Other), 18.1% Muslim, 8.4% Hindu, 1.4% Buddhist, 24.4% None

Median income: $35,600 (2020)

Average income: $49,160 (2020)

Member of Parliament

This riding has elected the following member of the House of Commons of Canada:

Election results
All electoral information is taken from Elections Canada.  Italicized expenditures from elections after 1997 refer to candidate submissions, and are presented when the final reviewed totals are not available.  Expenditures from 1997 refer to submitted totals.  The +/- figures from 1997 and 2004 are adjusted for redistribution.

Scarborough Southwest (1997-present)

Scarborough West (1968-1997)

See also
 List of Canadian federal electoral districts
 Past Canadian electoral districts

References

Riding history from the Library of Parliament
 Campaign expense data from Elections Canada

Notes

Federal electoral districts of Toronto
Ontario federal electoral districts
Scarborough, Toronto
1966 establishments in Ontario
1996 disestablishments in Ontario
1996 establishments in Ontario